Shangri-La's Fijian Resort is a resort-hotel located at Yanuca Island, on Viti Levu island, Cuvu, Sigatoka,
Fiji Islands. It is managed by Shangri-La Hotels and Resorts. It opened in 1967.

It has 436 rooms renovation completed in July 2005 while its 610 sq m Davui Events Centre is scheduled for competition by third week of 2006. It has a number of restaurants serving Asian and international dishes, often with vegetarian options.

Among its recreation facilities is a 9-hole executive golf course designed by British Golf Open winner Peter Thomson and floodlit tennis courts. Shangri-La's Fijian Resort provides seaside wedding at the non-denominational Seaside Wedding Chapel which can handle up to 42 guests.

Notes

External links
 Shangri-La's Fijian Resort official website

Hotels in Fiji
Buildings and structures completed in 1979
Shangri-La Hotels and Resorts
Hotels established in 1979
Hotel buildings completed in 1979
1979 establishments in Fiji